Middlebury is the shire town (county seat) of Addison County, Vermont, United States. As of the 2020 census, the population was 9,152. Middlebury is home to Middlebury College and the Henry Sheldon Museum of Vermont History.

History

One of the New Hampshire Grants, Middlebury was chartered by Colonial Governor Benning Wentworth on November 2, 1761. The name "Middlebury" came from its location between the towns of Salisbury and New Haven. It was awarded to John Evarts and 62 others. The French and Indian Wars ended in 1763; the first settlers arrived in 1766. John Chipman was the first to clear his land, Lot Seven. During the Revolutionary War, much of the town was burned in Carleton's Raid on November 6, 1778. After the war concluded in 1783, settlers returned to rebuild homes, clear forests and establish farms. Principal crops were grains and hay.

Landowners vied for the lucrative honor of having the village center grow on their properties. A survey dispute with Salisbury led to the forfeiture of Gamaliel Painter's farm to that town, and his transition from farming to developing Middlebury Village near his and Abisha Washburn's mill, together with other mills that surrounded the Otter Creek falls. Industries would include a cotton factory, sawmill, gristmill, pail factory, paper mill, woolen factory, iron foundry, and marble quarry. The Rutland & Burlington Railroad first arrived on September 1, 1849. Around 1830, Middlebury was the second largest town in Vermont.

Middlebury College, one of the United States' elite liberal arts colleges, was founded in 1800. It is a member of the NESCAC. In the summer, the town plays host to the annual Middlebury College Language Schools, as well as the college's Bread Loaf Writers' Conference, the oldest surviving conference of its kind in the nation.

On October 22, 2007, central Middlebury was evacuated for a short time because of a train derailment; the Middlebury Union Middle School served as the evacuation headquarters.

Today, as the largest town by population in Addison County, Middlebury serves as the commercial and business center for the region. Downtown hosts a three-screen movie theater, the post office, and two historic inns, as well as many shops and restaurants. There is considerable development along U.S. Route 7 heading south of town, including Shaw's and Hannaford supermarkets, two drugstores, most of the town's gas stations, and several fast-food spots. Of note is Middlebury's A&W, Vermont's only remaining car-hop restaurant and a popular spot with both locals and Middlebury College students. Along with A&W, fast food restaurants in Middlebury include a McDonald's, a Dunkin' Donuts, and a Subway.

Geography
Middlebury is located near the center of Addison County in western Vermont. The town is drained by Otter Creek, which flows from south to north along the western edge of the town, with the falls at the center of the village. The Middlebury River flows west to Otter Creek out of the mountains. Foothills of the Green Mountains border the town to the east, with the Champlain Valley to the west.

Middlebury is crossed by U.S. Route 7, Vermont Route 23, Vermont Route 30, Vermont Route 116, and Vermont Route 125. It is bordered by the towns of New Haven and Bristol to the north, Ripton to the east, Cornwall and Weybridge to the west, and Salisbury to the south. A new bridge over Otter Creek connecting Cross Street to Bakery Lane opened in November 2010 to serve as a shortcut and alleviate traffic through downtown. The village of East Middlebury is located in the southern part of the town, east of U.S. Route 7.

Climate
This climatic region is typified by large seasonal temperature differences, with warm to hot (and often humid) summers and cold (sometimes severely cold) winters.  According to the Köppen Climate Classification system, Middlebury has a humid continental climate, abbreviated "Dfb" on climate maps.

Education

Public

 Mary Hogan Elementary, grades Pre-K–5
 Middlebury Union Middle School, grades 6–8
 Middlebury Union High School, grades 9–12
 P.A. Hannaford Career Center regional technical center serving grades 9–12 and adults

Private

 The Aurora School (Pre-K only)
 Bridge School (elementary)
 St. Mary's Catholic Elementary School – closed 2016
 The Gailer School – closed 2012

Higher education 

 Community College of Vermont – Middlebury campus
 Middlebury College

Demographics

As of the census of 2010, there were 8,494 people, 2,860 households, and 1,642 families residing in the town.  The population density was 209.7 people per square mile (80.9/km2).  There were 2,805 housing units at an average density of 71.9 per square mile (27.7/km2).  The racial makeup of the town was 90.3% White, 4.3% Asian, 3.0% Hispanic or Latino of any race, 3.0% from two or more races, 1.3% Black or African American, 0.66% from other races, 0.2% Native American and 0.02% Pacific Islander.

There were 2,657 households, out of which 27.7% had children under the age of 18 living with them, 44.6% were couples living together and joined in either marriage or civil union, 10.4% had a female householder with no husband present, and 42.3% were non-families. 35.3% of all households were made up of individuals, and 14.4% had someone living alone who was 65 years of age or older.  The average household size was 2.24 and the average family size was 2.90.

In the town, the population was spread out, with 17.5% under the age of 18, 31.4% from 18 to 24, 18.6% from 25 to 44, 19.3% from 45 to 64, and 13.3% who were 65 years of age or older.  The median age was 27 years. For every 100 females, there were 90.7 males.  For every 100 females age 18 and over, there were 87.5 males.

The median income for a household in the town was $37,723, and the median income for a family was $46,691. Males had a median income of $32,645 versus $25,994 for females. The per capita income for the town was $17,926.  About 5.3% of families and 9.6% of the population were below the poverty line, including 8.2% of those under age 18 and 6.1% of those age 65 or over.

Transportation

Air
The Middlebury State Airport is located in the town for private aviation. Commercial airlines are available at Burlington International Airport to the north and Rutland Southern Vermont Regional Airport to the south.

Bus
Bus service is provided by Tri Valley Transit (formerly Addison County Transit Resources) (TVT). In addition, Premier Coach provides an intercity bus line in a joint venture effort with Greyhound via Vermont Translines on its Albany, NY to Burlington, Vermont route with stops in Rutland and Bennington as well. Service on this route began on June 9, 2014.

Highway
 U.S. Route 7 is the primary north/south highway through the town. It is known as Court Street south of the village, and North Pleasant Street north of the village.
 Vermont Route 23 is a north/south highway known as Weybridge Street and is located on the west side of town, crossing the college campus.
 Vermont Route 30 is a north/south highway entering the town on the south town line with Cornwall and ends at Route 7. It is known as Main Street within the town.
 Vermont Route 116 is a north/south highway located on the east side of town, ending near the East Middlebury village at Route 7. It is known as Case Street in Middlebury except for a short portion known as Ossie Road within the East Middlebury village.
 Vermont Route 125 is an east/west highway entering the town on the west side through Middlebury College where it is known as College Street. East of Route 7, Route 125 is known as East Main Street up until it exits the town at the Ripton town line.

Rail
Amtrak's Ethan Allen Express serves the city's station, connecting it to Burlington to the north and New York City to the south. Service began in the city in July 2022.

Until 1953 the Rutland Railroad ran passenger service on the Green Mountain Flyer (New York City - Montreal) and the overnight Mount Royal, making stops in the city.

Medical care

Middlebury and the surrounding area (Addison County) are served by Porter Medical Center.

Notable people 

 Julia Alvarez, author
 Robert B. Bates, Speaker of the Vermont House of Representatives
 Joseph Battell, publisher and philanthropist
 Ricardo Chávez Castañeda, author
 Thomas Treadwell Davis, U.S. congressman
 Lea Davison, professional mountain biker and two-time olympian
 John Deere, inventor and manufacturer
 James Rood Doolittle, U.S. senator from Wisconsin
 Joel Doolittle, Justice of the Vermont Supreme Court, born in Russell
 Jim Douglas, 80th governor of Vermont
 Ray Fisher, professional baseball pitcher and college coach
 Robert Frost (1874–1963), poet
 Ruth Hardy, member of the Vermont Senate
 Peter J. Hincks, Vermont State Treasurer 
 Ronald D. Liebowitz, former president of Middlebury College
 Charles Linsley, Vermont attorney and politician
 Gabriel Mann, actor and former model
 Samuel Mattocks, Vermont State Treasurer and father of Governor John Mattocks
 John M. McCardell, Jr., president emeritus and professor at Middlebury College
 Bill McKibben, author and environmentalist
 James Meacham, U.S. congressman
 Gamaliel Painter, local politician and town leader
 Edward John Phelps, lawyer and diplomat
 Samuel S. Phelps, U.S. senator
 William H. Porter, banker
 Steven C. Rockefeller, religion professor and son of Nelson Aldrich Rockefeller
 Patricia Ross, cross country skier
 Horatio Seymour, U.S. senator
 Patty Sheehan, golfer
 William Slade, U.S. congressman and 17th governor of Vermont
 David Allen Smalley, judge
 John Wolcott Stewart, U.S. senator and congressman
 Allen R. Sturtevant, Associate Justice of the Vermont Supreme Court
 Charles M. Swift, lawyer, businessman, founder of Meralco and several railroads
 John P. Townsend, financier of the Gilded Age
 Arthur Trudeau,  Army general and Ufologist
 Steve Vaillancourt, New Hampshire state legislator
 James M. Warner, manufacturer and general
 Emma Willard, women's rights advocate and school founder
 John Willard, U.S. Marshal for Vermont, husband of Emma Willard
 Isaac Wilson, U.S. congressman

Points of interest

 Emma Willard Memorial
 Henry Sheldon Museum of Vermont History
 Ilsley Public Library
 Middlebury State Airport
 Middlebury to Her Soldiers (sculpture)
 Otter Creek Brewing
 TAM – Trail Around Middlebury
 Woodchuck Hard Cider
 Vermont Experimental Cold Hardy Cactus Garden
 The Historic Marble Works – shopping, dining, services
 Danforth Pewter
 Beau Ties Ltd. of Vermont
 Vermont Soap Company
 Maple Landmark Woodcraft
 Middlebury Farmers Market
 Vermont Folklife Center

In popular culture
 A shot of Middlebury appears as stock footage, standing in for a fictional Pennsylvania town, in the 30 Rock episode "Episode 210".
 Middlebury College was mentioned briefly in the film American Graffiti.
 The bridge over the waterfall appears in the film Me, Myself & Irene.
 A shot of the Waybury Inn in East Middlebury was used in the opening of the TV series Newhart. Scenes of the town are also occasionally shown in the series.
 Snake Jailbird of The Simpsons is an alumnus of Middlebury College, having turned to a life of crime to pay his student loans.
 G. Stone Motors, a used car dealership in Middlebury, was the subject of Game Show Network's television series Family Trade in 2013.

References

Further reading
 A. J. Coolidge & J. B. Mansfield, A History and Description of New England; Boston, Massachusetts 1859
  Samuel Swift, History of the Town of Middlebury, Vermont; A. H. Copeland, Middlebury, Vermont 1859

External links
 Town of Middlebury official website
 Ilsley Public Library
 Middlebury College
 Middlebury Community Network 
 Early Vermont Maps and Atlases – Maps of Middlebury and the region from the 18th and 19th centuries (hosted by Middlebury College)
 City-Data.com

 
County seats in Vermont
Populated places established in 1761
Towns in Addison County, Vermont
Towns in Vermont